Pierre Novellie (born 31 January 1991) is a South African-born comedian.

Personal life 
Born in Johannesburg, South Africa, Novellie grew up on the Isle of Man and attended Corpus Christi College, Cambridge. At Cambridge he was a member and then Vice President of the Cambridge Footlights Revue.

Novellie has Asperger's syndrome.

Work 
He is known for his work as a comedian, actor, and writer, on both TV and radio. He has written for and performed on The Mash Report, Chris Ramsey's Stand Up Central, and The Now Show. He was also a guest on BBC Radio 4's The Rest is History hosted by Frank Skinner. Other highlights include appearing on the Joke Thieves pilot for BBC Two opposite Marcus Brigstocke, BBC Three's Edinburgh Comedy Fest Live and All4/4OD Comedy Blaps series Taxi Gags and Outsiders.

Pierre's writing credits also include the Spitting Image revival, Mock The Week, Newzoids, Adam Buxton's Shed of Christmas, and The Island. In addition to his television and radio credits and his own live shows, Pierre has supported Frank Skinner, Hal Cruttenden and Gary Delaney on tour.

He appeared alongside fellow comedian and Cambridge graduate Phil Wang on an episode of Dave's World's Most Dangerous Roads, broadcast in 2023.

Podcast 
He currently co-hosts the podcast BudPod alongside Phil Wang. Pierre previously hosted a regular podcast called My Favourite Podcast. He appeared on Episode 408 of Richard Herring's Leicester Square Theatre Podcast.

Awards 
Pierre has been nominated for several Chortle Awards and won the Amused Moose Laugh Off in 2013 at the Edinburgh Fringe Festival. In 2014 he was nominated for industry web-site Chortle’s Best Newcomer award. Pierre was nominated for Best Club Comic at the 2016 Chortle Awards.

References

Living people
People from Johannesburg
Alumni of Corpus Christi College, Cambridge
British male comedy actors
South African emigrants to the United Kingdom
British podcasters
1991 births